Chinatown is a populated place in Lawrence County, South Dakota, United States. The name was entered into GNIS on January 1, 1990.

See also
Deadwood, South Dakota

References

Geography of Lawrence County, South Dakota